Vera Valentinovna Alentova (born 21 February 1942) is a Soviet and Russian actress famous for her leading role in Moscow Does Not Believe in Tears.

Biography
Vera Alentova was born on 21 February 1942 in the town of Kotlas in the Arkhangelsk Oblast, in the family of actors Valentin Mikhailovich Bykov and Irina Nikolaevna Alentova. She was named in honor of her maternal grandmother, who died at the age of twenty-eight. The actress's grandfather graduated from Tomsk State University and worked as a doctor, her grandmother graduated from Bestuzhev's courses. Vera's father died when she was four years old, after which her mother took her to Ukraine.

She came to Moscow in 1961, where she entered the Moscow Art Theater School (course of Vasily Petrovich Markov). During the second course Alentova married Vladimir Menshov who was also studying acting at the same theatre school. Vera finished her studies in 1965, after which she became an actress of the Moscow Pushkin Drama Theatre. In the same year she debuted in cinema with the film Flying Days.

The actress appeared in a leading role as Nastya in the 1975 miniseries Such a Short Long Life which was about the life of ordinary Soviet families.

In 1979 Alentova starred in the popular romantic drama Moscow Does Not Believe in Tears which was directed by her husband Vladimir Menshov. It won the Academy Award for Best Foreign Language Film in 1981. In the film she played Katya Tikhomirova, a menial factory worker who rises to the ranks of a company director.

Vera Alentova played the ill-tempered head teacher Valendra in the 1987 picture Tomorrow Was the War by Yuri Kara.

Alentova acted in two more productions directed by Menshov — What a Mess! (1995) and The Envy of Gods (2000).

Since 2009, she co-operates with her husband Vladimir Menshov, an acting and directing workshop in VGIK.

Personal life
Vera Alentova married director Vladimir Menshov in 1962. They have a daughter, Yuliya Menshova.

Awards
USSR State Prize (1981) for her role in Moscow Does Not Believe in Tears
Honored Artist of the RSFSR (1982)
Vasilyev Brothers State Prize of the RSFSR (1986)
People's Artist of Russia (1992)
Order of Friendship (2001)
People's Artist of Russia
Order of Honour (Russia)

Filmography
 1966 Flying Days as Lidia Fyodorovna
 1967 The Red and the White as nurse
 1979 Moscow Does Not Believe in Tears as Katerina Tikhomirova
 1987 Tomorrow Was the War as Valentina Andronovna
 1995 What a Mess! as Carol Abzats, Zemfira Almazova, Lusiena Krolikova and Whitney Crolikow
 2000 The Envy of Gods as Sonia

References

External links

1942 births
Living people
People from Kotlas
People's Artists of Russia
Russian film actresses
Russian stage actresses
Soviet film actresses
Soviet stage actresses
20th-century Russian actresses
21st-century Russian actresses
Moscow Art Theatre School alumni
Recipients of the USSR State Prize
Academicians of the Russian Academy of Cinema Arts and Sciences "Nika"
Recipients of the Vasilyev Brothers State Prize of the RSFSR
Academicians of the National Academy of Motion Picture Arts and Sciences of Russia
Recipients of the Order "For Merit to the Fatherland", 4th class